Estádio Paulo Constantino, most commonly known as Prudentão, and formerly as Estádio Eduardo José Farah, or simply Farahzão, is a multi-use stadium in Presidente Prudente, in the state of São Paulo, Brazil. It is currently used mostly for football matches. The stadium holds 45,954. It was built in 1982. The stadium is owned by the Presidente Prudente City Hall, and its formal name honored Eduardo José Farah, who was the Paulista Football Federation president during the stadium reformation. Oeste Paulista Esporte Clube usually plays their home matches at the stadium.

History

The inaugural match was played on October 12, 1982, when Santos beat Corinthians (Presidente Prudente) 1–0. The first goal of the stadium was scored by Santos' Paulinho. The stadium maximum capacity at the time was 20,000 people.

The stadium's attendance record currently stands at 45,972 people, set on March 3, 1996, when Palmeiras beat Corinthians 3–1.

In 2001, the stadium maximum capacity was expanded to 50,000 people. However, the capacity was later reduced to its current 45,954 people.

References

Enciclopédia do Futebol Brasileiro, Volume 2 - Lance, Rio de Janeiro: Aretê Editorial S/A, 2001.

External links
 Templos de Futebol: Estádio Eduardo José Farah

Football venues in São Paulo (state)